The Uzh is a river, a right tributary of the Pripyat, which empties into the Kyiv Reservoir, in central Ukraine. It takes its source in the Zhytomyr Oblast (province) of northern Ukraine, and then flows briefly near the delta of the Berezina. The Uzh then flows near the city of Chernobyl of Kyiv Oblast, into the Pripyat.

Characteristics

The width of the valley - from 1 to 7 km, the river - from 5 to 40 m. The slope of the river is 0.47 m / km. The mineralization of water p. On average, it is: spring flood - 126 mg / dm³; summer-autumn measurements - 198 mg / dm³; winter cesspools - 214 mg / dm³. The river takes its source form the spring thaws. It freezes over in the winter, only thawing in late March, from which it takes much of its water supply.

Location

The cities of Korosten and Chernobyl are located on the Uzh river.

References

 Geographical Encyclopedia of Ukraine: 3 t. / Editorial Board: O. M. Marinych (repl. Ed.) And others. - K.: "Ukrainian Soviet Encyclopedia" by them. M.P. Bazhana, 1989.

Rivers of Zhytomyr Oblast
Rivers of Kyiv Oblast